Kennywood is an amusement park which is located in West Mifflin, Pennsylvania, just southeast of Pittsburgh. The park opened on May 30, 1899, as a trolley park attraction at the end of the Mellon family's Monongahela Street Railway. 

It was purchased in 1906 by F. W. Henninger and Andrew McSwigan, both of whom later formed the family-owned Kennywood Entertainment Company. The company later sold Kennywood, along with four other parks, in 2007 to Parques Reunidos, an international entertainment operator based in Spain. 

The amusement park features various structures and rides dating back to the early 1900s. Along with Rye Playland Park, it is one of two amusement parks in the United States designated as a National Historic Landmark. Kennywood is also one of thirteen trolley parks in the United States that remain in operation.

Location 
The park is along Pennsylvania Route 837 (Green Belt), known as Kennywood Boulevard as it passes through the borough. The closest Interstate connection is Exit 77 (Edgewood/Swissvale) on Interstate 376. The Mon–Fayette Expressway will eventually go past Kennywood, which will prompt an expansion of the park when it is built.

Historically, the park is on the location of the July 9, 1755 Battle of the Monongahela, where British general Edward Braddock was mortally wounded, ending his expedition to capture the French Fort Duquesne during the French and Indian War. George Washington was a colonel to Braddock, and fought at the battle before they retreated. Later the land on the bluff above the Monongahela River was part of a farm owned by Anthony Kenny. Starting around the time of the American Civil War, the site was a popular picnic grove for locals, known as "Kenny's Grove".

History 

A tree-filled portion of a farm owned by Anthony Kenny, known as "Kenny's Grove" overlooking the Monongahela River near Pittsburgh, Pennsylvania was a popular picnic spot for local residents since the American Civil War. In 1898, the Monongahela Street Railways Company, partially owned by prominent banker Andrew Mellon, seeking to increase fare profits on the weekends, leased the land from the Kenny family in order to create a trolley park at the end of their line. The company's chief engineer, George S. Davidson, designed the original layout of the park and served as its first manager. A carousel, casino hall, and dance pavilion were added in 1899. A bandstand was constructed in 1900, while the Old Mill was constructed in 1901, and the park's first roller coaster, the Figure Eight Toboggan, was added in 1902. 

After less than a decade, the trolley company no longer wanted to manage the park. The standing manager, Andrew S. McSwigan, along with partners Frederick W. Henninger and A. F. Meghan, leased and operated the park as Kennywood Park Limited beginning in 1906.

From its origin as a working-class picnic entertainment destination, the park grew in the first half of the twentieth century into a popular attraction that combined thrill rides with recreation venues such as swimming pools and dance halls.

Kennywood ceased to be served by streetcar when Mon Street Railways successor Pittsburgh Railways Company converted the route serving it, the lengthy #68 Duquesne-McKeesport line, to bus on September 15, 1958.

Today, the park features a nostalgic atmosphere and is supported by a loyal fan base. As of December 2007, Kennywood Entertainment also ran Sandcastle Waterpark , which opened in 1989; Idlewild Park  near Ligonier; Story Land , a children's theme park in Glen, New Hampshire; and Lake Compounce , New England's family theme park in Bristol, Connecticut, which is the oldest continuously operating amusement park in North America.

On December 12, 2007, Kennywood Entertainment announced that it would be selling Kennywood Park, along with Sandcastle Waterpark and four other amusement parks in the Northeastern United States, to Parques Reunidos, a company based in Madrid, Spain.

Kennywood now uses the slogans “Welcome to the Family”, "America's Finest Traditional Amusement Park", and "Make a New Memory", although from the 1960s through the early 1990s the slogan was "The Roller Coaster Capital of the World" (a title which is now being used by Cedar Point). The property features three old wooden roller coasters still in working order, along with three newer steel coasters, the Phantom's Revenge (2001) and the Sky Rocket (2010), The Steel Curtain (2019), and one indoor coaster, the Exterminator (1999).

Park timeline 

 2000: Aero 360, Garfield and Odie added as park mascots
 2001: Phantom's Revenge (rebuilt from Steel Phantom), Crazy Trolley
 2002: Pounce Bounce, Phantom Fright Nights debut
 2003: King Kahuna (formerly Top Spin from Lake Compounce), Ham-on-Rye, Volcano Valley themed area, Enterprise renamed Volcano, Roll-O-Plane and Miniature Golf removed
 2004: Garfield's Nightmare (theme change from Old Mill), Old Mill boats painted different color, Bayern Kurve removed
 2005: New front gate structures built, free admission and individual pay-per-ride tickets discontinued and replaced with general admission passes, Merry-Go-Round completely overhauled, Wurlitzer Band Organ repainted, Swing Around, Garden Stage, Kiddie Cadillacs, and Ham-on-Rye removed
 2006: Swing Shot installed, Flying Carpet removed
 2007: Cosmic Chaos, SS Kenny, Gold Rusher removed
 2008: Ghostwood Estate, new games building in Kiddieland, WipeOut relocated to Lake Compounce
 2009: Bayern Kurve returns, portions of Phantom's Revenge retracked, Turnpike and King Kahuna removed
 2010: Sky Rocket, Kenny's Kabanas replaces King Kahuna
 2011: Kandy Kaleidoscope, Parkside Cafe, and Star Refreshment remodeled, Merry-Go-Round horses and organ refurbished, Holiday Lights debut, Noah's Ark rerouted, Pitt Fall removed
 2012: Black Widow
 2014: Johnny Rockets replaces the Carousel Food Court
 2015: 4-D Theater showing Ice Age 4D: No Time for Nuts replaces Playdium Arcade
 2016: Noah's Ark renovation, former Lake Compounce Enterprise ride replaces Volcano but retains the same name
 2017: Sky Rocket VR experience debuts during Phantom Fright Nights, Ice Age 4D is replaced with The Lego Movie: 4D Experience, Floral Clock and Log Jammer removed
 2018: Thomas Town summer debut with new attractions, Olde Kennywood Railroad rethemed to coincide with Thomas Town, San Andreas 4D Experience begins showing at the 4-D Theater alongside The Lego Movie: 4D Experience, entrance to Raging Rapids moved, Sky Rocket is temporarily closed for maintenance all season
 2019: First stage of Steelers Country section opens with Steel Curtain, new pavilion behind Star Refreshments, The Lego Movie: 4D Experience is replaced with Thomas & Friends in 4-D: Bubbling Boilers, Sky Rocket reopens, Black Widow is temporarily closed for maintenance all season, Pounce Bounce and Orbiter removed
 2020: The rest of Steelers Country opens with the Steelers Experience and End Zone Cafe, Garfield's Nightmare converted to Old Mill, all Garfield theming removed, Floral Clock returns in new location, Black Widow remains temporarily closed all season, Steel Curtain is temporarily closed for maintenance all season, many attractions are temporarily closed for the season due to the COVID-19 pandemic, Phantom Fright Nights cancelled, five rides removed after the season (Bayern Kurve, Kangaroo, Kenny's Parkway, Paratrooper, and Volcano), Volcano Valley themed area disestablished
 2021: Black Widow and Steel Curtain reopen, some attractions remain temporarily closed for the season due to the COVID-19 pandemic, Phantom Fall Fest debut
 2022: Phantom's Revenge track fully debuts repainted track color, the park begins a three-year celebration of its upcoming 125th anniversary, Kangaroo returns due to popular demand following a refurbishment, entrance plaza refurbished and repainted, Old Mill receives a new facade, two new seasonal events, Swing Into Spring and Summer's On debut, Speedy Pass virtual queue system is introduced replacing the previous V.I.P. Coaster Tour system, all attractions that were closed due to COVID-19 pandemic reopen except for Skycoaster, 4-D Theater, and Raging Rapids
 2023: Spinvasion debuts alongside a new Area 412 themed section, Cosmic Chaos and Swing Shot repainted, Racer's paint gets touched up, the Pizza Warehouse restaurant remodeled

 

 1950: Roll-O-Plane, Loop-O-Plane removed
 1952: Octopus, Tickler removed
 1953: Swimming Pool closes and becomes U-Driven boat concession
 1955: Rotor, Swimming pool reopens after renovation and renames Sunlite Pool, Kiddie Cadillacs, Daffy Klub removed, Little Dipper renovated and renamed Dipper
 1957: Round-Up opens, Old Mill gets a Trip Aound The World retheme with the Mechanical Monkey Band
 1958: Wild Mouse, Rotor and Hurricane removed
 1959: Skydiver, Rock 'N Roll, Double Ferris Wheel, Crazy Orbit, Ridee-O removed
 1960: Bouncer, facade on Racer loading platform redesigned, Wild Mouse removed
 1961: Bandshell destroyed in fire, Calypso, new boats for Old Mill
 1962: Kangaroo opens
 1963: Tilt-A-Whirl removed
 1964: Tornado dark ride (from defunct Freedomland), new Round-Up model opens named Satellite
 1965: Rotor, Popover, Laff in the Dark and Octopus removed
 1966: Turnpike, Tornado removed
 1967: Road Runner (Cuddle Up), Ghost Ship dark ride replaces Tornado
 1968: Pippin becomes Thunderbolt after renovation (4 drops in the ravine and lift hill retained)
 1969: Noah's Ark remodeled, Loop-O-Plane, Roll-O-Plane removed, Rock 'N Roll removed, inner helix "speed hill" removed from Thunderbolt
 1971: Bayern Kurve, Roll-O-Plane
 1972: Le Cachot dark ride (translates to "The Dungeon" in French) replaces Safari, Monster, Rotor removed
 1973: Gran Prix, The Potato Patch, Sunlite Pool removed
 1974: Hardheaded Harold's Horrendously Humorous Haunted Hideaway (theme change of park's Old Mill), The dragon heads on The Old Mill boats removed, Crazy Orbit converted into Space Odyssey, Kenny Kangaroo debuts as park mascot, Monster removed
 1975: Log Jammer (first multimillion-dollar ride in the park history), Bouncer removed, Merry-Go-Round along with organ refurbished, a fire burns down Ghost Ship and Road Runner (Cuddle Up)
 1976: Tilt-A-Whirl, Round Up (damaged in 1975 fire) replaced by (Super) Round Up, Skydiver new model and renamed Paratrooper, Monster (removed after 1 season)
 1977: Cinesphere opens
 1978: Enterprise, Cinesphere renames to Cinema 180, Rockets and Space Odyssey removed
 1979: Monongahela Monster, Garden Stage, Skooter removed
 1980: Laser Loop opens
 1981: Gold Rusher, Paddle Boats open
 1982: Pirate, new PTC trains replace Wonder Bread versions on Racer
 1983: Ranger (removed after 1 season), Loop-O-Plane removed
 1984: Wave Swinger, Swing Around (removed after 1 season), Bayern Kurve (original replaced), Dipper removed
 1985: Raging Rapids, Super Round-Up relocated to Idlewild, Roll-O-Plane removed
 1986: Wonder Wheel, Bayern Kurve removed, new water features on Raging Rapids, Calypso removed
 1987: Musik Express, Turnpike electric cars added and are faced in reverse, Kennywood designated National Historic Landmark, The Old Mill dragon heads installed on the Pagoda refreshment stand
 1988: Flying Carpet, Rotor, Tilt-A-Whirl relocated to Idlewild, Kennywood Memories is filmed and premiers in September
 1989: Swing Around returns, Monongahela Monster removed
 1990: Great Balloon Race, Parachute Drop, original facade on Racer loading platform restored, Laser Loop removed
 1991: Steel Phantom, Merry-Go-Round organ major restoration, Tunnel for Jack Rabbit restored back to a shorter length
 1992: Tri-Star (removed after 1 season) 
 1993: WipeOut opens, Haunted Hideaway renamed Old Mill
 1994: Skycoaster, Bayern Kurve, Rotor removed (moved to Lake Compounce)
 1995: Lost Kennywood (expansion using former location of Sunlite Pool), Pittsburg Plunge, Phantom Phlyer, Roll-O-Plane, Wave Swinger relocated to Lost Kennywood, Great Balloon Race relocated to Idlewild, Parachute Drop closes
 1996: Lil Phantom (Kiddieland), Kenny's Parkway, Noah's Ark remodeled, Phantom Phlyer relocated to Lake Compounce, Auto Ride renamed Auto Race
 1997: Pitt Fall opens
 1998: Kennywood celebrates 100th anniversary, Centennial Midway (one season), Le Cachot demolished
 1999: Exterminator roller coaster, Wonder Wheel removed

 1898: Kenny's Grove purchased on December 18 by Monongahela Street Railway Co.
 1899: Kennywood Park formally opens on May 30, Merry-Go-Round (G.A. Dentzel carousel), Dancehall, Parkside Cafe
 1900: Figure Eight Toboggan (park's first coaster)
 1901: Old Mill (also formerly named/themed as Garfield's Nightmare, Hard Headed Harold's Horrendously Humorous Haunted Hideaway, and Panama Canal before being converted back to the Old Mill) Casino (park's restaurant)
 1903: Steeplechase opens
 1904: Steeplechase removed
 1905: Dip-the-Dips Scenic Railway
 1906: Figure Eight Toboggan renamed to Gee Whizz Dip the Dips
 1907: Panama Canal (re-themed Old Mill)
 1910: 1910 Racer (original version), Dip-the-Dips Scenic Railway removed
 1911: Speed-O-Plane, A fired occurred at the park
 1912: Panama Canal rethemed Old Mill Rapids Gorge from the fire
 1913: Merry-Go-Round (original G.A. Dentzel carousel replaced by T.M. Harton model)
 1915: Old Mill Rapids Gorge rethemed Old Mill
 1916: Wurlitzer Band Organ provides music for Merry-Go-Round
 1917: Old Mill rethemed Fiaryland Floats
 1919: Whip (replaced in 1926)
 1920: Jack Rabbit opens
 1921: Gee Whizz Dip the Dips and Figure Eight Toboggan removed, Fairyland Floats rethemed Tour of the World
 1922: Dodgem opens
 1923: Speed-O-Plane removed
 1924: Pippin (converted to Thunderbolt in 1968), Kiddieland (located near Jack Rabbit coaster)
 1925: Swimming Pool
 1926: 1910 Racer removed, Whip (16 car model), Tour of the World renamed Old Mill, Old Mill rebuilt and rethemed to comic or cartoon characters
 1927: Merry-Go-Round (T.M. Harton model replaced by William H. Dentzel model, retains Wurlitzer Band Organ), new Racer debut, Tumble Bug, Kiddieland moved to current location
 1928: Brownie Coaster, Tilt-A-Whirl opens
 1929: Dodgem removed
 1930: Auto Race, Laff in the Dark
 1931: Tickler roller coaster opens
 1934: Tilt-A-Whirl removed, Fun on the Farm opens
 1935: Teddy Bear roller coaster, Skooter opens
 1936: Noah's Ark (re-built in 1996), Loop-O-Plane, Fun on the Farm removed
 1937: 13 Spook Street, Kiddie Old Mill (Swan Boats, removed mid-1970s) opens
 1938: Ridee-O opens
 1940: Rockets (Traver circle swing added to island in lagoon)
 1941: Daffy Klub (replaces 13 Spook Street)
 1945: Olde Kennywood Railroad opens
 1946: Original facade on Racer loading platform replaced
 1947: Teddy Bear removed, Original Jack Rabbit tunnel removed
 1948: Little Dipper, Tilt-A-Whirl returns, Auto Race hills removed and cars renovated, Auto Race renamed Auto Ride, Tumble Bug receives new turtle-themed cars and renamed Turtle 
 1949: Hurricane opens

Recognition 
For the past several years, Kennywood has been rated the "Favorite 'Dark Attraction Park'" by the Darkride And Funhouse Enthusiasts, or DAFE.

It ranked second to Cedar Point in the category of "Favorite Park" in Theme Park Magazine's 2004 Reader's Choice Awards.

The park was designated a U.S. National Historic Landmark in 1987.

Attractions

Themed areas 
 Kiddieland was one of the first children's ride areas in the world, featuring all the rides in the park's diverse array of young child-specific rides in a compact area between the Auto Race and the Aero 360. Rides include miniature versions of the Turtle, Wave Swinger, Phantom's Revenge, Cosmic Chaos, Whip, and Merry-Go-Round. It is located next to the edge of the cliff on the river-view side of the park. It was originally located next to the Jack Rabbit before moving to its current location in 1927.
 Lost Kennywood, which was added to the park in 1995, was built on the old sunlite pool/pay parking lot area. The area references Kennywood's long history, including its short-lived rival Luna Park (1905–1909), and also the illusion of yesteryear's dangerous rides. The area includes the Pittsburg  Plunge, the Whip, the Bavarian Wave Swinger, the Exterminator, the Black Widow, and the Swing Shot. Older rides which have been removed from Lost Kennywood since its opening include the Phantom Phlyers, Roll-O-Plane, the Pitt Fall -drop tower ride and WipeOut. The gateway to Lost Kennywood is a one-third scale replica of Luna Park's main entrance which spells Pittsburgh with no 'H', because in 1905–1909, the name of Pittsburgh was commonly spelled that way.
 Thomas Town based around Thomas the Tank Engine opened as an extension of Kiddieland on July 27, 2018, containing 4 new rides and a re-themed Kennywood Railroad. Based on the popular long-running British television series, Thomas the Tank Engine & Friends.
 Steelers Country is themed around the Pittsburgh Steelers and includes a new roller coaster called Steel Curtain, which has the tallest inversion in the world and the most inversions in the United States. The area also includes a Steelers themed restaurant called the End Zone Cafe, and the Steelers Experience. Steel Curtain opened on July 13, 2019, and replaced the Log Jammer, a flume ride which closed on September 17, 2017.
 Area 412 is an intergalactic themed area with two alien themed rides, Cosmic Chaos and Spinvasion, the latter of which replaces the park's former Enterprise attraction, the Volcano, which closed in 2020. This section is to be officially established in 2023 with Spinvasion's debut, replacing the old former Volcano Valley area.

Former 
 Volcano Valley was established in 2003 for the addition of a new ride that year, King Kahuna. The Enterprise was rethemed as the Volcano during the transformation of this section of the park. The section then featured the King Kahuna, Pirate, Volcano, and cement volcanoes that are capable of spewing smoke. King Kahuna was replaced with Kenny's Kabanas after the 2009 season. Volcano Valley was disestablished as a themed area in 2020 after the removal of Volcano with Pirate and Kenny's Kabanas becoming independent from a themed area. In 2023, the portion of the area that had Volcano will be part of Area 412 with Spinvasion being on that land.

Roller coasters 
Kennywood has made use of the hilly Pittsburgh terrain to create coasters that wouldn't be feasible in some amusement parks. The Thunderbolt and the Jack Rabbit, both wooden coasters, place the lift chain in the middle of the ride, not at the beginning. In both cases, the car leaves the station and drops into a valley for its first hill. Phantom's Revenge uses the same valley as the Thunderbolt, where the Phantom's second drop passes through the supports of the Thunderbolt's first drop, making the second drop the longest and steepest drop in the ride.

Flat rides

Upcharge attractions

Dark rides

Water rides

Transportation rides

Kiddieland

Thomas Town 
Thomas Town opened in 2018 to complement Kiddieland. The Olde Kennywood Railroad has also become part of this area, re-themed as Journey With Thomas.

Former attractions

Notable landmarks and buildings

Entertainment 
 Entertainment is a focal point of Kennywood. Strolling musicians, live shows, and costumed characters are part of Kennywood's history. For the park's 100th anniversary in 1998, the park had side shows, magicians, and other events in their "centennial midway." During the 2008 season, the Kennyville Stage offered an act by Jason Pipatone – Master Entertainer as well as all day viewing of "Kenny TV", a closed circuit TV network displaying various videos and trivia. "Kenny TV" was at one time viewed at many other locations throughout the park, but the project was later abandoned and eventually removed. The Scheer's Lumberjack Show had a one-year run in 2008 replacing the "Pirates of Kenny Cove" high-dive show. In 2009, this location featured a show called Maximum Velocity, a BMX stunt show based on audience participation. The park also has strolling musicians and roaming mascots including the park's mascot, Kenny Kangaroo, who debuted in 1974. From 2001 up through the end of 2008, the comic characters Garfield and Odie also could be found at the park.

Nationality days 
 Nationality Days are several annual events, each spotlighting a different local culture. These include, but are not limited to, Irish Day, Greek Day, Serbian Day, Croatian Day, Polish Day, Slovak Day, Hungarian Day, and Italian Day. On these days some of the park's many picnic pavilions will be in use for entertainers of the particular day's nationality, including ethnic dancers.

Phantom Fall Fest 
Originally called Phantom Fright Nights until 2021, Phantom Fall Fest is a Halloween event held at Kennywood on Friday nights and all day Saturdays and Sundays during the month of October. The park traditionally opened at seven in the evening and closes at one in the morning. In 2015 the hours were changed from six until midnight. Then in 2021 the hours were change to Fridays from six to eleven, Saturdays from noon to eleven, and Sundays from noon to ten. The event began in 2002, though the concept of theming an amusement park for Halloween is not new. "Phantom Fright Nights" received third place in the Golden Ticket Awards for best Halloween event in 2007.

Labor Day traditionally marked the end of the season and the park would shut down until the spring. In 2002, Kennywood decided to break the long-standing tradition and turn almost half of the park into a giant Halloween extravaganza. The park's initial trial of Phantom Fright Nights in 2002 consisted of four traditional haunted houses, with only a few rides and roller coasters in operation. Despite the relatively limited scope of the opening year, the experiment proved to be a success, and new areas of the park and rides are opened for the festivities every year. In 2004 Kennywood debuted Gory Park, a haunted zone in Lost Kennywood. The following year, 2005, the park managed to have 3/4 of the rides and attractions operable due to high demand and record-breaking crowds. The park has reported attendance greater for one Fright Night than they have on a good normal operating day.

In the spirit of Halloween season, the park itself is given a complete make-over, with costumed actors roaming the paths, spooky music filling the air by dark wave bands Midnight Syndicate and Nox Arcana, and fog blanketing the park and every light bulb in the park is changed to a different color—even the restroom windows are covered in colored films. The merry-go-round horse normally found in the fountain by the entrance is replaced by a giant Phantom-like figure with glowing red eyes hovering over bubbling red blood (dyed water). In some places, sheets are hung up and classic horror movies are played, such as the original "House on Haunted Hill". Several areas of the park, including Kiddieland and Lost Kennywood, are turned into open-air haunted attractions. Other buildings, such as the Penny Arcade and the Parkside Terrace Cafe, are converted into more traditional haunted houses. Some rides are given entirely new lighting and fog effects including strobes and blacklights, or in the Exterminator's case, an absolute absence of light. In the case of the Carousel and Musik Express, Halloween-themed music is all that is played. Even the entrance tunnel is affected; a great amount of fog is pumped into the passageway and chainsaw-wielding characters stalk unsuspecting guests as they enter. These ghouls are also found throughout the park when least expected. Starting in 2018 Kennywood added Happy Hauntings, a family friendly Halloween event during the daytime every Saturday and Sunday in October with Kiddieland, Thomas Town, and most of the rides opened along with kid friendly Halloween activities. In 2021, Happy Hauntings and Phantom Fright Nights merged into one event called Phantom Fall Fest.

Kennywood discourages children under the age of thirteen from attending the park during Phantom Fall Fest at night as the atmosphere may be too intense for some younger children, but letting children attend is solely at the discretion of parents or guardians. Many children go to Fright Nights anyway, even with the suggestion since Kennywood will admit attendees of any age.

On September 24, 2022, three people were injured during a shooting inside the park during Phantom Fall Fest.

Haunted attractions 
Indoor Haunts
 Villa of the Vampire in the Penny Arcade
 Ark in the Dark in Noah's Ark
 Shady Grove Memorial Hospital in Kiddieland pavilion 17
 mAlice in Wonderland in Steelers Experience 

Outdoor Haunts
 Kennyville Cemetery in the grassy Dancing Waters/Gazebo area
 Dark Shadows in the back of Kiddieland
 Voodoo Bayou in the Raging Rapids trough

Haunted Midways
 Hellbilly Hollow in Lost Kennywood
 Fear Festival surrounding the area usually occupied by the George Washington statue
 Dead Light District between Mushroom fountain and Noah’s Ark
 The Welcoming inside tunnel

Past/Changed Haunts
 Creeper's Crypt in the Penny Arcade
 Fort Despair behind the Star Refreshment stand
 Terror Visions in 3-D in the former Whip Pavilion (Pavilion 23)
 Fear Festival was part of Gory Park for its first year.
 Dark Shadows once was located near Pavilion 5.
 Captain Skully's Curse In 3D in the former Whip Pavilion (Pavilion 23)
 BIOFEAR in the former Whip Pavilion (Pavilion 23)
 Captain Skully's Haunted Ark in Noah's Ark
 Mortem Manor in Parkside Cafe
 Haunted Ark in Noah’s Ark
 Gory Park in Lost Kennywood
 Death Valley Haunted Ghost Town in front of and leading up to Ghostwood Estate/Between Mushroom fountain and Noah’s Ark
 Mortem Manor Estate Sale between Mushroom fountain and Noah’s Ark

Kennywood in the media 

Kennywood's world-renowned reputation and nationwide popularity has led to its mention and appearance in many forms of media, including TV shows, movies, books, records, and has even warranted a reason to film a documentary about the park's history.

Television 
 Kennywood was mentioned in an episode of CSI: Crime Scene Investigation entitled "Turn of the Screws", which dealt with a Las Vegas roller coaster derailment. CSI Supervisor Gil Grissom, who is a roller coaster enthusiast, tells the park engineer that he holds the marathon riding record on the Steel Phantom in Kennywood Park, Pennsylvania.
Kennywood was also mentioned on an episode of Without a Trace. They showed the park, but the name of it was not the same. It had the famous Steel Phantom in the park also.
 After the Pittsburgh Steelers won Super Bowl XL in 2006, Steelers safety Mike Logan, a native of McKeesport, Pennsylvania, near Kennywood, made a humorous riff on the "I'm going to Disney World!" advertising campaign usually associated with the Super Bowl, saying, "Forget Disney World, I want them to open up Kennywood!"
 Singer/Actor Micky Dolenz, former drummer for The Monkees, often fondly tells audiences at his live shows that Kennywood was the location of his first ever public appearance. He appeared at Kennywood with his elephant in the 1950s when he was known as Circus Boy. The television series featured Micky as Corky, a boy who grows up on the road in a circus.
 A scene of Kennywood can be seen in the Nickelodeon TV program Zoey 101 (ep. 62: "Roller Coaster") with a sign reading "Spine Twister" on the lift hill of the Phantom's Revenge.
 The park appears in a season 2 episode of Shipping Wars in which shippers Christopher Hanna and Robbie Welsh were hired to transport the giant black widow spider figure that adorns the entrance of Black Widow from a theming company in New Jersey to Kennywood a few days prior to the ride's opening day. The ending scene of the episode shows Chris and Robbie riding the attraction.
 Kennywood was featured on the July 29, 2022, episode of CBS's Secret Celebrity Renovation featuring Billy Gardell who goes to Kennywood while renovating his best friend’s mom’s house.

Movies 
 In the 1993 film Striking Distance, a poster for Kennywood's Fraternal Order of Police picnic day is visible inside a Pittsburgh Police station.
 Footage of Kennywood's Musik Express was shown in the beginning of the 1994 film Only You. The Wonder Wheel was also featured in this movie.
 The 2009 film Adventureland was filmed at Kennywood.
 Parts of the 2022 film Dear Zoe was filmed at Kennywood.

Literature 
 Kennywood also served as the inspiration for "Joyland Park" in LJ Smith's teen horror novel The Forbidden Game: The Kill.
 Kennywood served as the main inspiration for Jennifer Cruise and Bob Mayer's novel Wild Ride. The writers acknowledged the park by thanking "Kennywood for giving us a place to start thinking about Dreamland".

Music 
 In 1899, Kennywood commissioned the "Kennywood Park Waltz" and it was popular around the turn on the century. Kennywood would sell the sheet music in the park. It was composed by Margaretha Scandroll. It has only been professionally recorded once for the 2007 documentary "Welcome Back Riders". It was performed by the Bulgarian Tosheff Piano Duo.
 In 1987, Rock 'n roll singer Freddy Cannon recorded a slightly remade version of his 1962 hit "Palisades Park" called "Kennywood Park", featuring attractions at Kennywood. The song was released on a limited-edition 45 vinyl pressing and sold as a $1.99 fundraising item for Pittsburgh's Children's Hospital through the now-defunct National Record Mart. The record is considered by some to be a collector's item today.

Documentary 
 On September 28, 1988, the local PBS station, WQED, first aired Kennywood Memories, a one-hour documentary about Kennywood. Rick Sebak narrated. Although many of the rides mentioned are since defunct, the historic information about the park is still quite relevant.
 Kennywood was featured in the 2007 documentary "Welcome Back Riders".

Park police 
Kennywood employs weapon-certified security officers that have the ability to make arrests that are supported by the district's local police force. A famous case resulting from a 1986 arrest of a park visitor for drug possession went all the way to the Pennsylvania Superior Court in 1988, which ruled in favor of the park's security force. The defendant had unsuccessfully attempted to have the evidence suppressed.

See also 

 National Register of Historic Places listings in Allegheny County, Pennsylvania
 Incidents at independent amusement parks

References

References

External links 

 
 
 Phantom Fright Nights Official Website 
 Kennywood Park Records, Detre Library & Archives, Heinz History Center
 Kennywood Park Records digital collection, Detre Library & Archives, Heinz History Center

 
1898 establishments in Pennsylvania
Amusement parks in Pennsylvania
Buildings and structures in Allegheny County, Pennsylvania
Historic districts on the National Register of Historic Places in Pennsylvania
National Historic Landmarks in Pennsylvania
National Register of Historic Places in Allegheny County, Pennsylvania
Palace Entertainment
Pittsburgh History & Landmarks Foundation Historic Landmarks
Tourist attractions in Allegheny County, Pennsylvania
Tourist attractions in Pittsburgh